The Woman of the Town is a 1943 American Western film directed by George Archainbaud and written by Aeneas MacKenzie. The film stars Claire Trevor, Albert Dekker, Barry Sullivan, Henry Hull, Porter Hall, Percy Kilbride and Clem Bevans.

The film was loosely based on the true stories of Dora Hand and Bat Masterson. It was released on December 31, 1943, by United Artists.

Plot

In 1919, Bat Masterson, now a newspaperman in New York City, reflects back on the previous century and his experiences in the American West.

Traveling to Dodge City, Kansas to look up Inky, an old friend, Bat becomes actively involved after the town's sheriff gets shot. He takes over as lawman, his major concern the ruthless rancher King Kennedy's band of rowdy cowboys.

Dora Hand's singing of a hymn in church leads to Bat becoming infatuated with her. He and the Rev. Small are surprised to discover that Dora works in the saloon, which is owned by "Dog" Kelley, who is also Dodge City's mayor. The reverend finds this inappropriate, but Bat writes a newspaper article condemning prejudice of any kind.

Dora has a good heart. She takes care of a sick child, impressing others in town. She also wants Bat to give up his dangerous life, so she asks her uncle in Kansas City to hire Bat for his newspaper there. The uncle is appalled by Dora's line of work and consents with one stipulation, that she never set foot in Kansas City again.

Back in Dodge, she declines Bat's marriage proposal, knowing she can't join him at the new job. She begins seeing King socially instead. But when a fight breaks out, King's errant gunshots hit Dora by mistake. After her funeral, Bat buries his guns and leaves town.

Cast 
Claire Trevor as Dora Hand
Albert Dekker as Bat Masterson
Barry Sullivan as King Kennedy	
Henry Hull as Inky Wilkinson 
Porter Hall as Mayor Dog Kelley
Percy Kilbride as Rev. Samuel Small
Clem Bevans as Buffalo Burns
Marion Martin as Daisy Davenport
Beryl Wallace as Louella Parsons
Arthur Hohl as Robert Wright
Teddi Sherman as Fanny Garretson
George Cleveland as Judge Blackburn
Russell Hicks as Publisher
Herbert Rawlinson as Doc Sears
Marlene Mains as Annie Logan
Dorothy Granger as Belle
Dewey Robinson as Waddy Kerns
Wade Crosby as Crockett
Hal Taliaferro as Wagner
Glenn Strange as Walker
Charley Foy as Eddie Foy Sr.
Claire Whitney as Mrs. Robert Wright
Russell Simpson as Sime
Eula Guy as Mrs. Brown
Frances Morris as Mrs. Logan
Tom London as Henchman (uncredited)

References

External links 
 

1943 films
American black-and-white films
Films directed by George Archainbaud
United Artists films
American Western (genre) films
1943 Western (genre) films
Cultural depictions of Bat Masterson
1940s English-language films
1940s American films